Return to the 7th Galaxy: The Anthology (1996) is an anthology of recordings made from 1972 to 1975 by bands assembled by Chick Corea under the name Return to Forever. The album is a compilation of tracks from the albums Light as a Feather, Hymn of the Seventh Galaxy, Where Have I Known You Before, and No Mystery, together with four previously unreleased tracks.

Track listing
CD disc 1:
 "500 Miles High" (Chick Corea, Neville Potter)
 "Captain Marvel" (Corea)
 "Light as a Feather" (Stanley Clarke, Flora Purim)
 "Spain" [previously unreleased live version] (Corea, Joaquín Rodrigo)
 "After the Cosmic Rain" [previously unreleased live version] (Clarke)
 "Bass Folk Song" [previously unreleased live version] (Clarke)
 "Hymn of the Seventh Galaxy" (Corea)
 "Captain Señor Mouse" [live version] (Corea)
 "Theme to the Mothership" (Corea)

Disc 2:
 "Vulcan Worlds" (Clarke)
 "Beyond the Seventh Galaxy" (Corea)
 "Earth Juice" (Corea, Clarke, Lenny White, Al Di Meola)
 "The Shadow of Lo" [previously unreleased live version] (White)
 "Where Have I Known You Before?" (Corea)
 "Song to the Pharaoh Kings" (Corea)
 "Dayride" (Clarke)
 "No Mystery" (Corea)
 "Flight of the Newborn" (Di Meola)
 "Celebration Suite (Parts I & II)" (Corea)

Personnel
 Chick Corea – keyboards (acoustic piano, Fender Rhodes electric piano, Hohner clavinet, Yamaha electric organ, synthesizers), marimba, gongs
 Stanley Clarke – double bass, electric bass guitar 
 Flora Purim – vocals, percussion (CD1 on tracks 1-3)
 Joe Farrell – flute, tenor saxophone (CD1 on tracks 1-3)
 Airto Moreira – drums (CD 1 on tracks 1-3)
 Bill Connors – acoustic guitar, electric guitar (CD1 on tracks 4-9)
 Mingo Lewis – percussion (CD1 on tracks 4-6)
 Steve Gadd – drums (CD1 on tracks 4-6)
 Al Di Meola – electric guitar, acoustic guitar (CD2)
 Lenny White – drums, percussion, congas, bongos, marimba (CD1 on tracks 7-9, CD2)

References

External links
 Return to Forever - Return to the Seventh Galaxy: The Anthology (1996) at VerveMusicGroup.com
 Return to Forever - Return to the 7th Galaxy: The Anthology (1996) album releases & credits at Discogs

Return to Forever albums
Jazz fusion compilation albums
1996 compilation albums